L'Unione Italiana, The Italian Club, is a historic social society in Tampa's Ybor City neighborhood. The group's building was designed by Tampa architect M. Leo Elliott. It is located at 1731 East Seventh Avenue.

History 

Originally founded as a mutual-aid society for Italian members in 1894 predominantly serving Italian immigrants, membership in the Italian Club grew from 107 members at founding to over 3,000 members by 1935.  The original building, built in 1911, burned down in 1914.  An entirely new building was constructed on East 7th Avenue in Tampa's Ybor City, completed in 1918 and still standing as of 2022.  Club membership entitled members to health insurance, including sick and death benefits for members. 

Santo Trafficante Sr. was a member of L'Unione Italiana, and he was buried in L'Unione Italiana Cemetery, which the Italian Club purchased and dedicated at its founding in 1894.

On December 9, 2018 the Italian Club celebrated the 100th anniversary of the building.  

On November 5, 2022, former Italian Club president Jamie Granell was awarded the Palo Longo Award; the award highlights an individual’s commitment to spend their lives perpetuating Italian traditions and heritage and helping pass down those traditions for future generations.

Festa Italiana 
Held each spring within weeks of Easter Sunday, Festa Italiana is a weekend of events, wine tastings, bocce ball tournaments, and celebrations celebrating Italian culture and heritage in Tampa Bay.

See also
Circulo Cubano de Tampa (Cuban Club)
Centro Asturiano de Tampa (Asturian Spanish Club)

References

Buildings and structures in Tampa, Florida
Italian-American culture in Tampa, Florida